Coteau Creek Hydroelectric Station is a hydroelectric station owned by SaskPower, located near Danielson Provincial Park about  south-west of Saskatoon, between the towns of Outlook and Elbow. The station is on the South Saskatchewan River and draws water from the Gardiner Dam and is named after a nearby tributary to the South Saskatchewan River.

The Gardiner Dam was constructed between 1959 and 1967.  The generating station required nearly 3 years to construct at a cost of CDN $40 million and became operational in 1969.

Description 

The Coteau Creek Hydroelectric Station has three 62 net MW vertical  Francis turbine-generator units. The turbines were supplied by English Electric with generators made by the Canadian division of Westinghouse. Each turbine draws water from an intake and control structure on Gardiner Dam, through an underground steel penstock.

The powerhouse building is 87.5 metres long, 20.1 metres wide and 38.4 metres high. In a normal waterflow year, the station can generate 800 million kilowatthours, about 5% of Saskatchewan's annual electric energy (as much as 100,000 Saskpower customers use in a year). A nearby substation contains circuit breakers and other apparatus that connects the power station to the transmission grid.

See also 

 SaskPower

References

External links 
  SaskPower Station Description
Danielson Provincial Park

Fertile Valley No. 285, Saskatchewan
Hydroelectric power stations in Saskatchewan
SaskPower